Béon is the name of several communes in France:

 Béon, Ain
 Béon, Yonne